Diaz Kusumawardani (born 2 November 1995) is an Indonesian sports shooter. She competed in the Women's 10 metre air rifle event at the 2012 Summer Olympics.

References

External links
 

1995 births
Living people
Indonesian female sport shooters
Olympic shooters of Indonesia
Shooters at the 2012 Summer Olympics
Sportspeople from Surabaya
20th-century Indonesian women
21st-century Indonesian women